Rwanda competed at the 2018 Commonwealth Games in the Gold Coast, Australia from April 4 to April 15, 2018.

Track and field athlete Salome Nyirarukundo was the country's flag bearer during the opening ceremony.

Competitors
The following is the list of number of competitors participating at the Games per sport/discipline.

Athletics

Men
Track & road events

Women
Track & road events

Beach volleyball

Rwanda qualified a women's beach volleyball team, by winning the African qualification tournament held in October 2017.

Cycling

Rwanda participated with 8 athletes (6 men and 2 women).

Road
Men

Women

Powerlifting

Rwanda participated with 1 athlete (1 man).

See also
Rwanda at the 2018 Summer Youth Olympics

References

Nations at the 2018 Commonwealth Games
Rwanda at the Commonwealth Games
Common